Playing Beatie Bow is a 1986 Australian time travel drama film. It is directed by Donald Crombie and stars Imogen Annesley, Peter Phelps and Mouche Phillips. The screenplay by Peter Gawler and Irwin Lane is based on the 1980 novel of the same name by Ruth Park.

Plot summary 
Beatrice May "Beatie" Bow, a young Victorian-era girl, is summoned from the past to contemporary 1986 Sydney by children, including eight-year-old Natalie, chanting her name. Sixteen-year-old Abigail Kirk, whose mother Kathy was looking at rekindling her relationship with her estranged husband, accidentally follows Beatie back to September 1873, in Sydney-Town in the colony of New South Wales. Beatie's family, including Granny and Dovey, believe Abigail is the promised "Stranger" who will arrive to save "The Gift" for future generations of Bows. The Gift comes at great sacrifice, though, as one of the Bow children—either Beatie, the "poorly" middle brother Gilbert Samuel (Gibbie) or the oldest brother Judah will die at a young age (Gibbie, who spends his time in bed reading "The Good Book", is convinced that he will be the one to die young). Abigail is trapped in the past until she does what she was "sent" to do, even though she does not know what this is. During her sojourn, she falls in love for the first time with Judah (who is promised to marry Dovey) and gains a more mature perspective on her parents' re-forming relationship.

After returning to her own time, Abigail finds that her friends Justine and her daughter, eight-year-old Natalie, are descendants of the Bow family and learns the fate of the Bow children. Beatie never married or had children, though she achieved her childhood dream of becoming a scholar and became the longtime headmistress of the Fort Street School and died in the 1920s. Gibbie, despite being convinced that he would be the one to die young, married an undertaker's daughter and lived until 1940 when he was 76 and was actually Justine's great grandfather. Abigail had saved Gibbie from a fire that all but destroyed the Bows' home located above Samuel Bow's confectionery shop, which was what she as the "Stranger" was sent to do thus preserving "The Gift" for future generations of the Bow family. Judah, whom Abigail had fallen in love with, married Dovey and they had a daughter in 1874, though the child died before her first birthday while Dovey died in 1919. Natalie then tells Abigail that Judah died in a shipwreck just outside of Hobart-Town at the age of 22, thus becoming the great sacrifice. Abigail then meets Justine's younger brother Robert who bears a striking resemblance to Judah and the pair fall in love, while Natalie has assumed the Bow family "gift" allowing her to become a talented piano player.

Cast
 Imogen Annesley – Abigail Kirk
 Peter Phelps – Judah Bow / Robert Bow
 Mouche Phillips – Beatrice May "Beatie" Bow
 Nikki Coghill – Dorcas "Dovey" Tallisker
 Moya O'Sullivan – Granny Bow
 Don Barker – Samuel Bow
 Trent Graham – Punchy
 Lyndel Rowe – Kathy Kirk
 Barbara Stephens – Justine Crown
 Damian Janko – Gilbert Samuel "Gibbie" Bow
 Phoebe Salter – Natalie Crown
 Su Cruickshank – Madam
 Edwin Hodgeman – Sir
 Grant Piro - Pino

Production
Playing Beatie Bow is directed by Donald Crombie, and produced by Jock Blair, Bruce Moir and John Morris. It is rated PG instead of the milder G because Abigail uses a swear word ("shit") towards the end of the film as well as two scenes in which Annesley appeared semi-nude. Also, due to Annesley only being 16 at the time of filming, the kissing scenes between herself and 26-year-old Phelps were "toned down" to avoid controversy.

Most of the film was shot in Adelaide, including using one of the city's iconic indoor amusement arcades "Downtown" and its popular second-floor roller skating rink for a scene early in the film. AU$400,000 was spent on recreating Sydney's Rocks area in a disused industrial site.

Box office
Playing Beatie Bow grossed $97,306 at the box office in Australia, which is equivalent to $212,127 in 2009 dollars. However the film was popular on video.

See also
 Cinema of Australia
 List of Australian films
 South Australian Film Corporation

References

External links
 
 Playing Beatie Bow – Rotten Tomatoes
Playing Beattie Bow at Oz Movies

1986 films
1986 drama films
Australian drama films
Films set in Sydney
Films shot in Adelaide
Films shot in Sydney
Films directed by Donald Crombie
Films based on Australian novels
Films about time travel
Films set in 1873
Films set in 1986
1980s English-language films